Golf in India is a growing sport. Golf is especially popular among the wealthier classes, but has not yet caught on with others due to the expenses involved in playing.

The most successful Indian golfers are Jeev Milkha Singh and Anirban Lahiri. Singh has won three titles on the European Tour, four on the Japan Golf Tour, and six on the Asian Tour. His highest world ranking to date is 28th, achieved in March 2009. Singh has won the Asian Tour Order of Merit twice. Meanwhile, Lahiri has two European Tour wins and seven Asian Tour wins. He qualified for the 2015 Presidents Cup.

Other Indians who have won the Asian Tour Order of Merit are Jyoti Randhawa in 2002 (the first Indian to achieve this) and Arjun Atwal, who went on in 2010 to become the first India-born player to become a member of the US-based PGA Tour and win the 2010 Wyndham Championship.

India's men's team won gold at the 1982 Asian Games. They also won silver at the 2006 Asian Games and 2010 Asian Games. Lakshman Singh won the individual gold medal at the 1982 Asian Games. Shiv Kapur won the individual gold medal at the 2006 Asian Games.

There are numerous golf courses all over India. There is a Professional Golf Tour of India. The main tournament is the Hero Indian Open, co-sanctioned by the Asian Tour and European Tour.

In addition to the commendable performances by the golf players of India, the Indian Golf Union (IGU) is making earnest efforts to improve the standard of the game in the country. Established in 1955, IGU made a significant decision in 1995, which gave rise to the birth of a separate body for the sport - Professional Golfers' Association of India (PGAI). Recent development in Indian golf is commencement of Indian Pitch and Putt Union, apex body of Pitch and Putt Golf in India, and membership of International Pitch and Putt Association. The effort of IPPU to support golf infrastructure in India is also appreciated by World Golf Foundation; In his letter to IPPU Secretary General Rakesh Purohit,  Steve Mona, CEO of WGF, gave his support and encouraged the program of IPPU to develop Pitch and Putt Golf in India. The Indian Golf Union ( IGU ) and HVR SPORTS (Chairman: Harshavardhan Reddy) have come out with new schemes to grow the sport in India.

Total medals won by Indian Golfers in Major tournaments

Notable Performance at Summer Olympics

Golf Associations in India

Governing bodies of Sport 

 Indian Golf Union apex body of Golf affiliated to International Golf Federation
 Professional Golf Tour of India, the controlling body for professional golf in India
 Women Golf Association of India, women's pro golf organisation of India
 Professional Golfers’ Association (PGA)of India, a body involved in educating and training its members to the highest level who are involved in the various aspects of the game for its overall development. 
 Indian Pitch and Putt Union, the governing body of Pitch and Putt Golf in India member of International Pitch n Putt Associations
 Paralympic Golf Association of India, organisation for golfers with disabilities in India
 India Golf Tourism Association, organisation for golf tourism in India

Golf Industry Association 

 Asia Golf Industry Show Hosted by CII 
Golf Industry Association, the industry group to develop and support different industries of golf and allied business
 Golf Course Superintendents & Managers Association of India, their objective is to assist all golf course developers, owners, and entrepreneurs running golf courses.

Leading Golf Event Organisers 

 Romitbosegolf
 My Golf Tours 
 Premier Lifestyle Event Management 
 India Golf Tours 
 Sports & Leisure Worldwide
 Brandon de Souza Management Services
 MYT Sports & Adventures Marketing Pvt Ltd 
 Ace Golf
 Professional Management Group
 Rishi Narain Golf Management
 Dehradun Golf Academy

Major Golf Tournaments in India 
2014 season on the professional tour had 24 tournaments. SAIL-SBI Open, and the Panasonic Open were co-sanctioned by the Asian Tour and the Take Solutions India Masters was co-sanctioned by the Asian Development Tour. BILT Open, CG Open, Louis Philippe Cup, TATA Open and the Mcleod Russel Tour Championship were the ones with the highest Prize monies. The 2015 Hero Indian Open is co-sanctioned by the Asian Tour and the European Tour.

The Expat Cup, The Bonallack Trophy, SAIL Open, DLF Women's Indian Open, The India Golf Festival, Corporate Team Challenge, Kashmir Golf Festival, Take Solutions World Corporate Golf Challenge, The Toyota Golf Festival, Mercedes Trophy, Citibank World Golfers Championship, ICICI Bank Private Banking Masters, The ICICI Bank International Pro-Am, The British Airways Executive Challenge, The World NRI Challenge, Barclays Invitational,

Golf Infrastructure in India 

India currently has 196 registered golf courses and around 50% of those registered courses are situated on military bases, which are only accessible to military. 35 additional courses are un-affiliated (approx 17 Pitch and Putt Courses). This leaves roughly 135 courses to cater for a civilian golf demand.

The makeup of the golf course supply is split between 18-hole (39% share) and 9-hole (60% share) facilities, with three 27-hole clubs. 
Research collected for KPMG's Golf Benchmark Survey indicates that the average number of rounds played per annum at 18-hole facilities ranges from 25,000 to 30,000 (excluding military courses). At some of the busier clubs where floodlights are used, hours can be extended to accommodate a higher demand. 

Average annual revenues for both 9- and 18-hole courses range US$180,000–200,000 (excluding military courses) with some larger, more popular clubs reaching anywhere up to $800,000 per year.

Another major challenge India faces today in developing golf courses is the inability to acquire land in both a cost- and time-efficient manner. Land parcels are generally small, and developers need to purchase multiple plots at a cost that can quickly inflate. The initial steps taken when planning a project with a golf component can be time-consuming, expensive and misunderstood, delaying developments and have, in some instances, resulted in the omission of golf from project master plans.

India may need to build up to 100 new courses to satisfy the demand over the next decade. An increase in participation can be achieved by:

 Building more affordable and accessible facilities
 Increasing activity in junior and academy golf
 Effectively promoting amateur golf to a wider audience by developing more Pitch and Putt courses.
Future course development seems inevitable and may need to come, hand-in-hand with real estate opportunity. Provided that the challenges that exist in India can be overcome, there is great potential in this growing golf market.

References